Ivy Day (Ireland), October 6 in memory of the prominent nationalist politician Charles Stewart Parnell.
 Ivy Day (United States), ceremonial occasion at older colleges when a class memorial stone is unveiled.